Mama's Affair is a 1921 American silent romantic comedy film directed by Victor Fleming and based on the play of the same title by Rachel Barton Butler. Cast members Effie Shannon, George Le Guere and Katharine Kaelred reprise their roles from the Broadway play.

Plot
As summarized in a film publication, a prologue, which explains where the author got her idea for the story, shows Adam and Eve in the Garden of Eden. When the serpent tells Eve to bite the apple, Adam takes it away from her. The serpent then tells her to go into hysterics and Adam will give her the apple. Shifting to the modern story, Mrs. Orrin (Effie Shannon), Eve's (Constance Talmadge) mother, goes into hysterics at the thought of losing her daughter. Mrs. Orrin and Mrs. Merchant (Katharine Kaelred), who lives with them, have decided that Eve will marry Mrs. Merchant's son Henry (George LeGuere), an effeminate youngster with rimmed glasses. Fearing her mother's nerves, Eve is willing to marry Henry, so the four of them go to Mama Orrin's birthplace, where the wedding is scheduled to take place on her birthday. During the stay at the hotel Mama has one of her "attacks" and Dr. Harmon (Kenneth Harlan) is called in. He soon discovers the exact trouble and orders Mrs. Orrin to bed with instructions that she not even see her daughter. Mrs. Orrin disobeys these orders and then Eve's nerves give way, causing a second visit by the doctor. He takes Eve away from the mother, but after Henry accuses the doctor of being a fortune seeker, the doctor refuses to have anything to do with Eve. Finally, Eve's eyes are opened and she uses a "treat 'em rough" theory on her mother. Besides winning the love of her doctor, she cures her mother of her hysterics.

Cast
 Constance Talmadge as Eve Orrin
 Effie Shannon as Mrs. Orrin
 Kenneth Harlan as Dr. Harmon
 George Le Guere as Henry Marchant
 Katharine Kaelred as Mrs. Marchant
 Gertrude Le Brandt as Bundy

Psychoanalytic elements
Plot elements involving Eve's genuine fit of hysteria before the planned wedding, the doctor's simple cure of removing Eve from her mother, and Eve's subsequent immediate recovery and ability to live an independent life were consistent with then-current popular understandings of Sigmund Freud's theories of repression and the causation of neurosis. The film, however, never directly discusses these notions or uses any psychoanalytic terms in its intertitles.

Preservation
A print of Mama's Affair is maintained in the Library of Congress.

References

External links

John Emerson and Anita Loos, Breaking into the Movies, Philadelphia: G.W. Jacobs. The ending of the Mama's Affair scenario is on pages 30–32.

1921 films
American films based on plays
Films directed by Victor Fleming
American black-and-white films
Cultural depictions of Adam and Eve
American silent feature films
1921 romantic comedy films
Films with screenplays by Anita Loos
American romantic comedy films
Surviving American silent films
1920s American films
Silent romantic comedy films
Silent American comedy films